Viktoria Borisovna Vasilieva (born 25 November 2003) is a Russian figure skater. As a junior-level single skater, she is the 2018 Alpen Trophy champion, the 2018 Junior Grand Prix Czech Republic bronze medalist and the 2019 Junior Grand Prix Russia bronze medalist.

Career

Early years 
She trained with her first coach, Maria Kudryavtseva, at the Moskovich Sports School in Moscow until 2015, after which she began taking from Viktoria Butsaeva. In 2018, Vasilieva moved to CSKA Moscow to train under Sergei Davydov.

2017–18 season 
Vasilieva competed at her first junior international assignment, the 2017 Ice Star, in October, where she placed third behind countrywomen Anna Tarusina and Ksenia Pankova. She next competed at the 2018 Russian Junior Figure Skating Championships, where she finished 6th.

2018–19 season 
Vasilieva received her first Junior Grand Prix (JGP) assignment, the 2018 JGP Czech Republic in September. She finished third overall behind countrywoman Alena Kostornaia and South Korean competitor Kim Ye-lim but did not receive a second JGP assignment. She did, however, receive two additional junior international assignments – 2018 Alpen Trophy and the 2018 Russian-Chinese Youth Winter Games – both of which she won.

At her first senior-level nationals, the 2019 Russian Figure Skating Championships, she finished 11th. She did not compete at the junior-level championships.

2019–20 season 
Vasilieva competed at her first international event of the season, 2019 JGP Russia, in September, where she earned the bronze medal behind countrywomen Kamila Valieva and Ksenia Sinitsyna and set new personal bests in the free skate and overall. At her next JGP event, 2019 JGP Poland, she finished second overall behind American skater Alysa Liu and qualified for the final spot to the 2019–20 Junior Grand Prix Final.

At the Junior Grand Prix Final, Vasilieva set a new personal best in the short program but ultimately finished 6th overall. Ongoing joint problems prevented her from competing at the junior and senior national championships and the 2020 Winter Youth Olympics. She did not receive any additional assignments for the season. In June 2019, when the Russian Figure Skating Federation released their list of national team candidates for the 2020–21 season, Vasilieva was named as having transitioned from singles to pairs skating to compete with Nikita Volodin under the tutelage of Alexei Sokolov in Saint Petersburg.

2020–21 season: Debut of Vasilieva/Volodin 
Vasilieva/Volodin made their national debut as a team at the fourth stage of the domestic Russian Cup series in November 2020. They placed 8th in the short program and 7th in the free skate, finishing 7th overall.

Programs

With Zaporozhets

With Volodin

As a single skater

Results

With Zaporozhets

As a single skater

Detailed results 
Small medals for short and free programs awarded only at ISU Championships.

With Zaporozhets

With Volodin

Women's singles

Senior results

Junior results

References 

2003 births
Living people
People from Mytishchi
Russian female single skaters
Sportspeople from Moscow Oblast